Lương Thế Huy (born 31 October 1988) is a Vietnamese jurist and LGBT rights activist.

Biography
He study laws at Ho Chi Minh City University of Law and University of California, Los Angeles.

He has been doing LGBT-related social work since 2008. He was listed as one of Forbes 30 Under 30 in Vietnam in 2016 and "Asia 21 Young Leaders" of Asia Society in 2018. In 2019, he became Director of Institute for Studies of Society, Economy and Environment (iSEE). In May 2021, he contested the Vietnam's National Assembly elections, became first openly LGBT candidate. He was not elected despite being one of the most prominent independent candidates for Hanoi city.

References 

Vietnamese LGBT rights activists
21st-century jurists
1988 births
Living people
Vietnamese LGBT politicians
Gay politicians
Vietnamese politicians